Ezard Haußmann (10 February 1935 – 6 November 2010) was a German stage, television and film actor. He and costume designer Doris Haußmann were the parents of film director Leander Haußmann. Haußmann appeared in several of his son's films, with  including Sonnenallee in 1999 and NVA in 2005.

Haußmann was born in Berlin on 10 February 1935 to Eric Haußmann, an actor, and Ruth Wenger. He appeared in his first theater role at the age of 18.

Ezard Haußmann died of a brain tumor on 6 November 2010 at his home in Berlin, Germany, at the age of 75.

References

External links

1935 births
2010 deaths
German male stage actors
German male film actors
German male television actors
20th-century German male actors
21st-century German male actors
Male actors from Berlin
Recipients of the Order of Merit of Berlin